1993 in the Philippines details events of note that happened in the Philippines in the year 1993.

Incumbents

 President: Fidel Ramos (Lakas)
 Vice President: Joseph Estrada (NPC)
 Senate President:
 Neptali Gonzales (until January 18)
 Edgardo Angara (starting January 18)
 House Speaker: Jose de Venecia, Jr.
 Chief Justice: Andres Narvasa
 Philippine Congress: 9th Congress of the Philippines

Events

February
 February 2–April 4 – The eruption of Mayon Volcano kills 77 people, mostly farmers, due to pyroclastic flow from the eruption of the volcano. Aside from pyroclastic flows, the volcano also spewed ash and lava. The towns of Mabinit, Bonga, Camalig, Sto. Domingo, Legazpi in Albay were damaged.
 February 7 – Alfredo de Leon, suspected leader of the organized crime group Red Scorpion Gang, splinter group of the New People's Army's urban terrorist wing Alex Boncayao Brigade, is killed in a police raid in Bulacan.

June
 June 23–27 – Typhoon Goring causes massive damage to the provinces in Northern and Central Luzon, leaving 51 people dead, 5 missing, 109 injured and  billion in damages.
 June 28 – University of the Philippines Los Baños students, Eileen Sarmenta and Allan Gomez, are abducted by the men of Calauan, Laguna mayor Antonio Sanchez, later killed and found dead the following day. Sanchez is arrested on Aug. 13; with his six henchmen, would be convicted in 1995.

July
 July 2 – 266 people are killed after a pagoda sank in Bocaue, Bulacan due to overloading of the boat.

September
 September 7–10 – The remains of former Pres. Ferdinand Marcos are returned to his hometown in Ilocos Norte, Sept. 7, four years after his death in exile in Hawaii, as part of the deal by the government and his family; are interred in a mausoleum in Batac, Sept. 10.
 September 24 – In what will be the biggest corruption case in the Philippines, former First Lady Imelda Marcos, for the first time, and former Transportation Minister Jose Dans are convicted by the Sandiganbayan of two counts of graft and sentenced to 9–12 years in prison for each count, in connection with a lease between the Light Rail Transit Authority and the Philippine General Hospital Foundation Inc. However, in 1998, Marcos will be acquitted by the Supreme Court.

October
 October 7 – The musical Les Misérables opens at Meralco Theater.

December
 December 13 – President Ramos signs Republic Act No. 7659, reinstating capital punishment for selected crimes, which had been banned in the 1987 Constitution.
 December 15 – A C-130 military plane crashes into a hill and explodes in Libmanan, Camarines Sur; out of about 30 people on board, twenty-four bodies are retrieved from the crash site.
 December 24 – Five shoppers are killed and 48 others are wounded in a grenade explosion at a market in Misamis Occidental.
 December 26 – Grenade attacks occur in a Roman Catholic cathedral and a Muslim mosque in Davao City; at least 6 people are killed and more than 130 are wounded in the first incident, while there are no casualties in the second one.

Holidays

As per Executive Order No. 292, chapter 7 section 26, the following are regular holidays and special days, approved on July 25, 1987. Note that in the list, holidays in bold are "regular holidays" and those in italics are "nationwide special days".

 January 1 – New Year's Day
 April 8 – Maundy Thursday
 April 9:
 Good Friday
 Araw ng Kagitingan (Day of Valor)
 May 1 – Labor Day
 June 12 – Independence Day 
 August 29 – National Heroes Day
 November 1 –  All Saints Day
 November 30 – Bonifacio Day
 December 25 – Christmas Day
 December 30 – Rizal Day
 December 31 – Last Day of the Year

In addition, several other places observe local holidays, such as the foundation of their town. These are also "special days."

Sports
 June 12–20 – The Philippines participates in the 1993 Southeast Asian Games.

Television

Unknown
 Maskman on IBC-13
 Shaider on IBC-13
 Metalder on IBC-13
 Kamen Rider Black or Masked Rider Black on IBC-13
 Machineman on IBC-13
 Koseidon on ABS-CBN

(Premiere)
 Bioman on IBC-13
 Candy Crush on ABS-CBN

Births
 January 4 – Marlo Mortel, actor
 January 17 – Ken Chan, actor and singer
 January 19 – Tristan Ramirez, member of BoybandPH
 January 20 – Meg Imperial, actress
 January 25 – Kylie Padilla, actress and singer
 February 10 – Kevin Ingreso, football player
 February 11 – Marlann Flores, actress and comedienne
 February 12:
 Mac Belo, basketball player
 Tommy Peñaflor, actor and That's My Bae contestant
 February 13 – Nikko Natividad, members of Hashtags
 February 17 – AJ Perez, actor (d. 2011)
 February 19 – Empress Schuck, actress and Commercial Model
 March 19 – Zeus Collins, member of Hashtags
 March 23 – Lito Adiwang, mixed martial artist
 March 26 – Kevin Ferrer, basketball player
 April 13 – Juancho Trivino, actor
 April 16 – Ann B. Mateo, actress and commercial model
 April 17
Lauren Reid, actress and commercial model
 Drex Zamboanga, mixed martial artist
 May 4:
 Monica Verallo, Filipino journalist and actress
 Joyce Pring, television personality and host
 May 11 – James Reid, actor and singer
 May 14 – Albie Casiño, actor
 May 20 – Devon Seron, member of Girltrends
 June 18 – Arno Morales, actor
 June 20 – Jasmine Alkhaldi, swimmer
 June 29 – Alyssa Valdez, volleyball player
 July 12 – Scottie Thompson, basketball player
 August 4 – Kirsti Kho
 August 17 – Axel Torres (born Alexander David Torres), actor and basketball player
 August 23 – Mikee Agustin, member of Girltrends
 September 20 – Shine Kuk, actress
 September 23 – Lloyd Cadena, vlogger, radio personality, and author (d. 2020)
 September 26 – Dindin Santiago-Manabat, volleyball player
 September 29 – Teejay Marquez, actor
 September 30 – Kim Fajardo, volleyball player
 October 9:
 Sarah Lahbati, actress
 Jhoana Marie Tan, actress
 October 10 – Paolo Onesa, singer 
 October 12 – Carl John Barrameda, actor
 October 16 – Jovit Baldivino, singer (d. 2022)
 October 27 – Kiefer Ravena, basketball player
 October 31 – Nadine Lustre, singer-actress
 November 4 – Moira Dela Torre, singer
 November 7 – Hiro Peralta, actor
 November 8 – Lauren Young, actress
 November 12 – EJ Jallorina, actor
 November 13 – Maria dela Cruz, football player
 December 2 – Jak Roberto, actor
 December 3 – Gian Barbarona, singer
 December 8 – Yamyam Gucong, actor and comedian
 December 11 – Mikoy Morales, actor and singer
 December 16 – Elias EJ M. Lopez, Jr., PEZA Examiner
 December 23 - Jessie Lacuna, swimmer

Deaths
 February 25 – Mary Walter, actress (b. 1912)
 March 11 – Presentacion P. Policarpio, businesswoman (b. 1956)
 March 31 – Chichay, actress and comedian (b. 1918)
 May 25 – Rogelio Roxas, former soldier and locksmith
 May 26 – Fernando Lopez, Vice President of the Philippines (b. 1904)
 July 24 – Rene Requiestas, Filipino actor (b. 1957)
 October 18 – Salvador P. Lopez, writer, journalist and diplomat (b. 1911)
 November 7 – Jon Hernandez, Filipino actor (b. 1969)

References

 
1993 in Southeast Asia
Philippines
1990s in the Philippines
Years of the 20th century in the Philippines